Heurne is a hamlet in the municipality of Aalten, near Aalten (Achterhoek region) in the eastern Netherlands.

It was first mentioned in 1492 as Horne, and means "bent [of a hill]". The postal authorities have placed it under Aalten. In 1840, it was home to 274 people.

Heurne has a village centre, "D'n Heurnsen Tref" and is known of the border crossing Heurne-. Across the Heurne lies the Hamelandroute. Heurne does not have a centre, only a few stores at the border crossing. 
To avoid confusion with De Heurne (Dinxperlose Heurne"), Heurne is locally known as "Aaltense Heurne".

References 

Populated places in Gelderland
Aalten